The 2021–22 Ohio Bobcats women's basketball team represented Ohio University during the 2021–22 NCAA Division I women's basketball season. The Bobcats, led by ninth year head coach Bob Boldon, played their home games at the Convocation Center in Athens, Ohio as a member of the Mid-American Conference.
The Bobcats finished non-conference play at 6–3. During a conference win at Central Michigan on January 15, Cece Hooks passed Caroline Mast as the leading scorer in Ohio basketball history. Two games later, against Bowling Green, she passed Toldeo’s Kim Knuth as the leading scorer in MAC basketball history.  They finished the regular season 15–13 and 9–10 in the MAC.  They were knocked out of the MAC tournament in the quarterfinals by top-seeded Toledo and in the first round of the WNIT by eventual champion South Dakota State.

Offseason

Departures

2021 recruiting class

Preseason
Prior to the season Ohio was picked first in the MAC preseason poll.  Cece Hooks and Erica Johnson were named to the preseason first team all-conference.

Preseason rankings

MAC Tournament Champion: Buffalo (5), Ohio (3), BGSU (2), Ball State (1), EMU (1)

Source

Preseason All-MAC 

Source

Award watch lists

Roster

Schedule

|-
!colspan=9 style=| Non-conference regular season

|-
!colspan=9 style=| MAC regular season

|-
!colspan=9 style=| MAC Tournament

|-
!colspan=9 style=| National Invitational Tournament

Awards and honors

Weekly Awards

All-MAC Awards 
After the season Cece Hooks won an unprecedented 4th MAC defensive player of the year.

Source

References

Ohio
Ohio
Ohio Bobcats women's basketball seasons
Ohio Bobcats women's basketball
Ohio Bobcats women's basketball